Sodium ricinoleate  is the sodium salt of ricinoleic acid, the principal fatty acid derived from castor oil. It is used in making soap, where its molecular structure causes it to lather more easily than comparable sodium soaps derived from fatty acids. It is a bactericide. It exhibits several polymorphic structural phases.

As a surfactant, sodium ricinoleate is an irritant to human skin and mucous membranes, causing hypersensitivity responses. These are due to castor bean constituents, which can be removed in order to prepare it as a food-grade ingredient.

Sodium ricinoleate was a constituent in toothpaste and was the 'SR' of Gibbs SR toothpaste, the first product to be advertised on British TV (in 1955).

References

Citations 

 
 
 
 

Organic sodium salts